Dušan Horváth (born 31 October 1964) is a retired Czech football striker.

References

1964 births
Living people
Czech footballers
FC Baník Ostrava players
Dukla Prague footballers
MŠK Žilina players
FC Hradec Králové players
EPA Larnaca FC players
MFK Karviná players
Alemannia Aachen players
Bonner SC players
Association football forwards
Czech expatriate footballers
Expatriate footballers in Cyprus
Czech expatriate sportspeople in Cyprus
Expatriate footballers in Germany
Czech expatriate sportspeople in Germany
Czechoslovakia youth international footballers